The flag of the state of Oregon is a  two-sided flag in navy blue and gold with an optional gold fringe. On the front is the escutcheon from the state seal and on the reverse is a gold figure of a beaver, the state animal. Oregon is the only U.S. State to feature different designs on either side of its flag (the flag of Massachusetts was changed in 1971 to be single-sided).

History
The current flag of Oregon became official on February 26, 1925. What is believed to be the first flag of Oregon produced was made that year by Meier & Frank, sewn by Marjorie Kennedy and Blanche Cox, employees of the department store. That flag was donated to Eastern Oregon University in 1954 by the grandson of former governor Walter M. Pierce. In 2010, the flag was restored.

Proposed change
For the Oregon Sesquicentennial in 2009, The Oregonian created a statewide contest to redesign the state flag. The newspaper collected and published the entries with the public voting on the winning design. The winning design was created by Randall Gray, a map maker for Clackamas County. In his design, Gray emphasized the beaver found on the current flag's reverse. The star represents Oregon's place in the Union while the green represents the natural wilderness and forests of Oregon. After the contest had started with votes being cast, there were requests for the Oregonian to add an 11th option, "NONE OF THE ABOVE", meaning, keep the current state flag as it is. In the final tally of votes, "NONE" received the most votes. 

In 2013, a bill was introduced to the Oregon Senate that would have made several changes to the flag design; however, the bill never made it out of committee. This bill was sponsored by state Senator Laurie Monnes Anderson, on behalf of Gresham resident Matt Norquist, who lobbied for the flag's change.

The bill describes the proposed design as follows:

Description

The flag field is navy blue with all lettering and symbols in gold, representing the state colors of Oregon. On the obverse, the legend STATE OF OREGON is written above an escutcheon, which also appears in the Oregon state seal. The shield is surrounded by 33 stars, representing Oregon's admission to the Union as the 33rd state. Below the shield is written 1859, the year in which Oregon became a state.

Oregon's flag is the last remaining state flag in the U.S. in which the obverse and reverse sides have different designs. Paraguay is the only country that still has a two-sided flag. Two-sided flags were previously more common, but have been reduced due to increased costs of manufacturing a flag with two different designs. On the reverse of the flag is a depiction, also in gold, of a beaver, the state animal of Oregon.

For dress or parade use, the flag may feature a gold fringe. For standard use, no fringe is required. The ratio of the flag's width to its length is 3:5.

It is one of eight U.S. state flags to feature an eagle, alongside those of Illinois, Iowa, Michigan, New York, North Dakota, Pennsylvania and the former flag of Utah.

See also

Seal of Oregon
List of Oregon state symbols
Flags whose reverse differs from the obverse
Flag of Portland, Oregon

References

External links
Chapter 186 — State Emblems; State Boundary 2005 Oregon Revised Statutes

Oregon
Symbols of Oregon
Flags of Oregon
Oregon